Beledweyne District is a district in the central Hiran region of Somalia. Its capital lies at Beledweyne. The district is mostly inhabited by the Hawadle and Gaalje'el .

References

External links

 Districts of Somalia
 Administrative map of Belet Weyne District

Districts of Somalia
Hiran, Somalia